Martin Richard Hoffmann (April 20, 1932 – July 14, 2014) was a U.S. administrator. He served as the United States Secretary of the Army between 1975 and 1977.

Early life
Martin was born in Stockbridge, Massachusetts on April 20, 1932. He served in the United States Army from September 1954 to November 1955, and was a US Army Officer from November 1955 to May 1958. He served in the Army (Officer) Reserve until 22 October 1975, retiring with the rank of Major.

Government career
Hoffmann served as general counsel of the Department of Defense, 1974 - 75. He was appointed as Secretary of the Army from August 5, 1975, until February 13, 1977.

Death
Martin Richard Hoffmann died of cancer in 2014, aged 82.

References

External links

1932 births
2014 deaths
United States Secretaries of the Army
Princeton University alumni
Deaths from cancer in Virginia
People from Stockbridge, Massachusetts
Burials at Arlington National Cemetery